La Bella Vita is the first studio EP by South African music producer IIndman, released on February 27, 2015 by MARS. The cover was designed by Cherie Cordier and named after the concept of a Beautiful Life with a synopsis by Madri Van Wyk.

Release 
The EP's title and release date were announced on February 14, 2015 as form of a private listening session at The North-West University Gallery.

Critical reception 
Okayafrica stated that the EP is a crumbling tunnel of drum whips, muffled vocals, and scraped effects. Rated | MC = 3/5 by PXY Magazine, the EP is well throughout and brilliantly executed, with a very lo-fi production to La Bella Vita, IIndman was recognised by fairly known blog Mishka NYC stating that "If you are a fan of instrumentals that drift you miles away, this was definitely up your alley, consisting of eighteen minutes of instrumental relaxation, creeping along and pleasant to the ears"

Track listing

References 

IIndman albums
2015 EPs